Adrian Rus (born 18 March 1996) is a Romanian professional footballer who plays as a centre-back for Italian  club Pisa and the Romania national team.

Club career
Rus started his career as a senior in 2014 with hometown side Olimpia Satu Mare, before moving to Hungary the following year and representing Fehérgyarmat, Balmazújváros and Puskás Akadémia.

The latter team loaned him out for the 2018–19 season to Sepsi OSK in his native country. On 25 June 2019, Rus continued in Hungary and its Nemzeti Bajnokság I by signing for Fehérvár.

On 1 August 2022, Rus signed a four-year contract with Italian team Pisa.

International career
Rus was selected in the Romania under-21 squad for the 2019 UEFA European Championship, recording one appearance as his team was eliminated by defending champions Germany in the semi-finals.

After the conclusion of the under-21 tournament, Rus received his first call-up to the Romania senior team, and on 8 September 2019 started in a 1–0 victory over Malta counting for the Euro 2020 qualification.

Personal life
Born in Satu Mare, near the Romanian border with Hungary, Rus acquired citizenship of the latter country and was eligible for its national team. He however stated in a 2019 interview for the Romanian Football Federation that feels "100% Romanian" and desires to represent his country of birth.

Career statistics

Club

International

Scores and results list Romania's goal tally first, score column indicates score after each Rus goal.

Honours
Fehérvár
Magyar Kupa runner-up: 2020–21

References

External links

1996 births
Living people
Sportspeople from Satu Mare
Romanian sportspeople of Hungarian descent
Romanian footballers
Association football defenders
FC Olimpia Satu Mare players
Nemzeti Bajnokság I players
Nemzeti Bajnokság II players
Balmazújvárosi FC players
Puskás Akadémia FC players
Fehérvár FC players
Liga I players
Liga III players
Sepsi OSK Sfântu Gheorghe players
Serie B players
Pisa S.C. players
Romania under-21 international footballers
Romania international footballers
Romanian expatriate footballers
Expatriate footballers in Hungary
Expatriate footballers in Italy
Romanian expatriate sportspeople in Hungary
Romanian expatriate sportspeople in Italy